1,1-Diphenylacetone is an organic compound composed of a benzhydryl group and a methyl group attached to a central carbonyl group.

Preparation
One method is where phenylacetone is dissolved in benzene, reacted with bromine to effect an α-keto bromination and stirred for 3-6 hours. Then this mixture is slowly added to a solution of anhydrous aluminum chloride in benzene to catalyze a Friedel-Crafts alkylation. A lengthy workup of the reaction mixture ends in recrystallization of the product 1,1-diphenylacetone from petroleum ether.

References

Aromatic ketones
Benzhydryl compounds